Leon Feraru (born Otto Engelberg, also credited as L. Schmidt; 1887 – 1961 or 1962) was a Romanian and American poet, literary historian and translator. Cultivating proletarian literature while frequenting the Symbolist movement, he displayed both his origins in the Romanian Jewish underclass and his appreciation for the wider Romanian culture. He popularized the latter with his work in America, having left in 1913 to escape antisemitic pressures. A translator, publicist, and public lecturer, he was involved with the Romanian press of New York City, and eventually as a Romance studies academic at Columbia and Long Island. Feraru's poetry, collected in two volumes, mixes Romanian patriotism, traditionalist references, and modern industrial aesthetics.

Biography
Born in Brăila into a modest Jewish family, his father was an ironworker (fierar), the origin of his pseudonym. He completed his basic education in his native city, graduating from the Schwartzman Brothers school and then the Bălcescu Lycée. This was followed by a literature and law degree from the University of Montpellier, and a published debut in Saniel Grossman's Jewish review, Lumea Israelită. Barbu Nemțeanu's Pagini Libere also hosted his work in August 1908. In 1910–1912, his poetry was featured in two of the major Bucharest literary journals, Flacăra and Convorbiri Critice, as well as in Symbolist Al. T. Stamatiad's Grădina Hesperidelor.

Alongside Stamatiad, Enselberg-Feraru was also an affiliate of the Vieața Nouă circle, and a regular at its coffeehouse salon, La Gustav. Other reviews that ran his work included Viața Romînească, Noua Revistă Română, Viața Literară și Artistică, Ecoul, and Conservatorul Brăilei. Pen names he used in these publications were Ola Canta (shared with Dimitrie Anghel), H. Libanon and L. Feru. Feraru was friends with Jean Bart, Camil Baltazar and especially Anghel, with whom he collaborated on several poems (Halucinații, Orologiul and Vezuviul). They are thought to be mostly, or entirely, Anghel's work. Feraru is also credited with having helped change Anghel's earlier antisemitic stance, making him into a noted defender of Jewish emancipation.

By late 1912, Feraru was a leading contributor to Nicolae Xenopol's Țara Nouă. Following the antisemitic outcry that came about as a result of the staging of Ronetti Roman's play Manasse and similar episodes, he emigrated to the United States in early 1913. Anghel, who died a year later, addressed his departing friend a public proof of support, the Scrisoare către un emigrant ("Letter to an Emigrant"). In his adopted country, Feraru became a constant promoter of Romanian culture, as confirmed by his correspondence and noted in the accounts of his contemporaries. He married a fellow Romanian immigrant, who had lost her fluency in Romanian; he insisted that she relearn the language, and also taught it to their child.

Initially working as an unskilled laborer, Feraru eventually became a teaching assistant at the University of Toronto. He then was a professor of Romance languages and literature at Columbia University (1917–1927), contributing to The Romanic Review and Rumanian Literary News (which he edited). In October–November 1917, at New York's American Jewish Congress, he and Joseph Barondess were rapporteurs on the condition of Romanian Jews. By 1919, he was working on the city's Romanian American community press. In January 1920, he and Dion Moldovan were editorial secretaries at Steaua Noastră. Our Star, Phillip Axelrad's self-proclaimed "Oldest Best and Most Popular Roumanian Weekly Newspaper in America". In March, Feraru and Moldovan issued their own România Nouă, which only put out one issue.

In 1925, Feraru made a return visit to Romania, tending to his family's grave and feeding his urge to converse in Romanian, but also setting up a Society of the Friends of the United States. His first book of poetry was Maghernița veche și alte versuri din anii tineri ("The Old Shanty and Other Verse of Youth"), put out by Cartea Românească of Bucharest in 1926. During the early 1920s, Feraru was a contributor to Omul Liber, a social-literary bimonthly edited by Ion Pas, Curierul, Pessach, Pagini Libere, and Tânărul Evreu. In 1922, Adevărul Literar și Artistic published his recollection of "Ola Canta" work with Anghel, alongside his copy of an Anghel manuscript. He was later featured in Cugetul Liber, put out in Bucharest by Pas and Eugen Relgis, his texts also published in the Union of Romanian Jews organ, Curierul Israelit. Feraru's work was sampled in literary newspapers such as Victoria, Ateneul Literar, Junimea Moldovei, and Cafeneaua Politică și Literară. His second and last book of Romanian verse came out in 1937 as Arabescuri ("Arabesques"), issued as a supplement by Pas' social democratic review Șantier.

Back in America by February 1926, Feraru received became Honorary Consul of Romania in New York, by appointment of King Ferdinand I. He was employed by Long Island University (1927–1947) as professor and, for a while, as head of the foreign languages department. He wrote two English-language critical studies of Romanian literature: The Development of the Rumanian Novel (1926) and The Development of the Rumanian Poetry (1929). His research received sympathetic coverage from historian and Prime Minister Nicolae Iorga: "[Feraru's studies] are not just an enjoyable read, but also sometimes contribute innovative pieces of information and assessment, such as are worthy of one's attention." Feraru also translated selections from Mihai Eminescu, Tudor Arghezi, Panait Cerna, Anton Pann, Vasile Cârlova and Dimitrie Bolintineanu into English. In May 1929, he gave public readings of these at Sunnyside.

Later, he submitted articles and reviews for The International Encyclopedia (1930) about Gala Galaction, Mateiu Caragiale, Ioan Alexandru Brătescu-Voinești, Lucian Blaga, and his friend Baltazar. Retiring in June 1954, through his will Feraru left Columbia University, which paid his pension, his library of some ten thousand Romanian-language books. He died in New York City in 1961 or, according to other sources, 1962. In 2012, relatives of his, the Schreibers, were still residing in Brăila.

Poetry
According to literary historian and critic George Călinescu, Feraru's poetic works fall into two separate categories: "moving" regrets for his native Romania, and samples of proletarian literature, including an ode to the sound of hammers in industrial Brăila ("his most valid" poetry). Another such ode, addressed "to the needle" and published in Convorbiri Critice, was lauded by its editor Mihail Dragomirescu: "Leon Feraru, a formal virtuoso, [...] presents here the sort of talent that he will rarely rise up to in later years." According to Eugen Lovinescu, Feraru fits best in a "realist and social" subset of Romanian poets, alongside Relgis and Vasile Demetrius; Călinescu also places Relgis and Feraru in the "poetry of the professions" category, with the likes of Barbu Solacolu and Alexandru Tudor-Miu.

In his more sentimental poems, Lovinescu notes, Feraru showed influences from Romanian traditionalists and Symbolists: Anghel, Panait Cerna, George Coșbuc, and Ștefan Octavian Iosif; his poems of homesickness no longer relevant to the modern and "evolved capacity for expression." According to novelist Dem. Theodorescu, who reviewed his poetry for Adevărul, Feraru could not hide his Romanian poetic soul in "the iron discipline of American life"—"his childhood was his nationality". His patriotic verse, Theodorescu noted, displayed a "grieving harmony". Similarly, sociologist Mihai Ralea noted the contrast between Feraru's "sentimentalism", or "unsoiled gentleness", and "that diabolical anthill of technology [...] that is America." In Maghernița veche, "none of the poems is about American life. [...] The only sentiment that is induced to [Feraru] by that alien world across the ocean is a longing for his native country".

Notes

References
George Călinescu, Istoria literaturii române de la origini pînă în prezent. Bucharest: Editura Minerva, 1986.
Ileana-Stanca Desa, Dulciu Morărescu, Ioana Patriche, Adriana Raliade, Iliana Sulică, Publicațiile periodice românești (ziare, gazete, reviste). Vol. III: Catalog alfabetic 1919–1924. Bucharest: Editura Academiei, 1987.
Ileana-Stanca Desa, Dulciu Morărescu, Ioana Patriche, Cornelia Luminița Radu, Adriana Raliade, Iliana Sulică, Publicațiile periodice românești (ziare, gazete, reviste). Vol. IV: Catalog alfabetic 1925-1930. Bucharest: Editura Academiei, 2003.  
Camelia Hristian, Ghena Pricop, Evdochia Smaznov (eds.). Greci, evrei, ruşi lipoveni, turci… Brăila. Reactivarea memoriei culturale a orașului. Brăila: Editura Istros, 2012.  
Eugen Lovinescu, Istoria literaturii române contemporane, II. Evoluția poeziei lirice. Bucharest: Editura Ancona, 1927.
Mihail Sadoveanu, Depărtări. Bucharest: E. Marvan, 1930.

1887 births
1960s deaths
Romanian male poets
Romanian literary historians
Romanian philologists
Romanian memoirists
Romanian translators
Romanian magazine editors
Romanian magazine founders
Romanian encyclopedists
Romanian book and manuscript collectors
20th-century American poets
20th-century Romanian poets
20th-century American translators
American literary historians
American philologists
20th-century American memoirists
American magazine editors
American magazine founders
American encyclopedists
American book and manuscript collectors
Jewish poets
Jewish encyclopedists
People from Brăila
Jewish Romanian writers
University of Montpellier alumni
Romanian emigrants to the United States
Romanian expatriates in Canada
American people of Romanian-Jewish descent
Romance philologists
Academic staff of the University of Toronto
Columbia University faculty
Long Island University faculty
Proletarian literature
20th-century philologists